Echinopsis silvestrii is a species of cactus from Argentina. It should not be confused with Echinopsis chamaecereus, formerly known as Chamaecereus silvestrii.

References

silvestrii
Taxa named by Carlo Luigi Spegazzini